John Charles Sydney Daly (1901–1985) was an Anglican bishop in Africa and Asia for fifty years.

Education
Educated at Gresham's School, Holt, and King's College, Cambridge, Daly was ordained as a Church of England deacon and priest in 1923.

Career
In 1935, he became the youngest bishop in the Anglican communion when he was appointed as bishop of the new diocese of Gambia and Guinea (sometimes called Gambia and the Rio Pongas). He was consecrated a bishop on the Feast of Saints Philip and James (1 May) 1935, by Cosmo Lang, Archbishop of Canterbury, at All Hallows-by-the-Tower.

During the Second World War, Daly also served as a District Scout commissioner. In 1944 he led the Gambian contingent attending a Jamboree at Katibougou in the French Sudan (now Mali), jointly organised for Francophone and Anglophone Boy Scouts.

He was later translated to become the Anglican bishop of the dioceses of Accra (1951–1955), Korea (1956–1965), and Taejon (1965–1968).

Daly's appointment as Bishop in Korea followed the Korean War of 1950 to 1953, leaving him with major challenges for his mission. Most contact with North Korea was severed, and the country faced huge economic, political and social problems. Translated from Accra to Korea on 15 July 1955, he was enthroned at the Cathedral Church of St Mary and St Nicholas, Seoul, on 17 January 1956.

In 1965, the Diocese of Korea was divided into two when Paul Ch’on-Hwan Li (Paul Lee, the first Korean bishop of the Anglican Church in Korea) was consecrated as Bishop of Seoul and Daly was sent to become Bishop of Taejon.

Daly lived to celebrate his fiftieth year as a bishop. The Bishop John Daly Mission Center at Gumi, Korea, was named in memory of him.

Career summary
Church of England priest, 1923
Bishop of Gambia and Guinea (or Gambia and the Rio Pongas), 1935–1951
Bishop of Accra, 1951–1955
Bishop of Korea, 1956–1965
Bishop of Taejon, 1965–1968
Assistant Bishop of Coventry, 1968–1975
Priest-in-charge of Honington, Warwickshire with Idlicote and Whatcote, 1968–1970
Vicar of Bishop's Tachbrook, 1970–1975

References

1901 births
1985 deaths
People educated at Gresham's School
Alumni of King's College, Cambridge
20th-century Anglican bishops in Africa
Anglican bishops of Gambia and the Rio Pongas
Anglican bishops of Accra
Korean bishops
Anglicanism in the Gambia
20th-century Anglican bishops in Asia
British expatriate bishops
Anglican bishops in Korea
Anglican bishops of Daejeon